Meinrad Ernst (14 May 1925 – 30 October 2019) was a Swiss wrestler. He competed in the men's freestyle featherweight at the 1960 Summer Olympics.

References

External links
 

1925 births
2019 deaths
Swiss male sport wrestlers
Olympic wrestlers of Switzerland
Wrestlers at the 1960 Summer Olympics
Sportspeople from the canton of Zürich
People from Bülach District